Valencia (València) is the capital of the Valencian  Community in Spain. 

Valencia may also refer to:

Places

Spain
 Valencian Community (or the Valencian Community), an autonomous community of Spain
 Valencians, an ethnic group or nationality whose homeland is the Valencian Community
 Valencian language, the "own language" (llengua pròpia) of the Valencian Community, also regarded as a linguistic variety of the Catalan language
 Province of Valencia, a Valencian subnational entity within the Valencian Community
 Valencia (Congress of Deputies constituency), the parliamentary district covering the province of Valencia
 Valencia (DO), Denominación de Origen wine-producing region within Valencia province
 University of Valencia, a Spanish University
 Roman Catholic Archdiocese of Valencia in Spain, a Catholic ecclesiastical territory located in northeastern Iberia
 Gulf of Valencia
 Taifa of Valencia, an entity that existed during Islamic Spain from c. 1010 to c. 1238
 Kingdom of Valencia, an entity of the Crown of Aragon that existed from 1238 to 1707
 Valencia de Alcántara, a town in Extremadura
 Valencia de Don Juan, a town in Castile and León

Philippines
 Nueva Valencia, a third income class municipality in the province of Guimaras
 Valencia, Bohol, a fourth income class municipality in the province of Bohol
 Valencia, Bukidnon, a second income class component city in the province of Bukidnon
 Valencia, Cagdianao, a barangay in Cagdianao municipality in the province of Dinagat Islands
 Valencia, Negros Oriental, a first income class municipality in the province of Negros Oriental

United States
 Valencia, California, an unincorporated community in Los Angeles County
 Valencia, Santa Clarita, California, a neighborhood in Santa Clarita in Los Angeles County
 Valencia West, Arizona, a census-designated place (CDP)
 Valencia, Santa Fe County, New Mexico, a CDP
 Valencia, Valencia County, New Mexico, a CDP
 Valencia, Pennsylvania, a borough
 Valencia (Ridgeway, South Carolina), plantation house listed on the U.S. National Register of Historic Places in Fairfield County, South Carolina

Venezuela
 Valencia, Venezuela, third largest city in Venezuela
 Roman Catholic Archdiocese of Valencia in Venezuela, an archdiocese located in the city of Valencia in Venezuela
 Lake Valencia (Venezuela), a lake within Carabobo State and Aragua State, in northern Venezuela

Other
 Valencia, Córdoba, Colombia
 Valencia, Ecuador
 Valencia, Trinidad and Tobago
Valencia, Universidad, Puerto Rico
 Lake Valencia (Peru)

People 
 Adolfo Valencia (born 1968), Colombian footballer
 Alejandra Valencia (born 1994), Mexican archer
 Antonio Valencia (born 1985), Ecuadorian footballer
 Angie Sanclemente Valencia (born 1979), Colombian model
 Clemente Valencia (1968–2011), Mexican professional wrestler better known as Doctor X
 Danny Valencia (born 1984), American-Israeli major league baseball player
 Enner Valencia (born 1989), Ecuadorian footballer
 Esteban Valencia (born 1972), Chilean footballer
 Eugene A. Valencia Jr. (1921–1972), United States Navy fighter ace in World War II
 Juan José Florián Valencia (born  1982), Colombian paracyclist
 Jesse Valencia, American musician, author, and actor
 Larry Valencia (born 1958), American politician
 Robin Valencia, American "canon-girl" stuntwoman

Sports 
 Club Valencia (Maldives), a Maldivian football club
 Valencia Basket, a Spanish basketball club
 Valencia CF, a Spanish football club
 Valencia FC (Haiti), a Haitian football club
 Circuit de Valencia, a motor racing circuit in Spain
 Valencia Street Circuit, a motor racing circuit in Spain
 Comunitat Valenciana, Spanish cycling team (2004–2006), formerly Kelme

Music 
 Valencia (band), an American alternative rock band
 "Valencia" (song), a 1926 pasodoble by Spanish composer José Padilla
 "O Valencia!", a 2006 song by The Decemberists

Other uses
 Valencian, a member of Pembroke College, Cambridge
 SS Valencia, a ship wrecked in 1906
 Valencia (1926 film), a 1926 American silent romance film
 Valencia (1927 film), a 1927 German silent film
 Valencia (2011 film), a 2011 adaptation of Michelle Tea's novel of the same name
 Valencia, the code name of the American film 10 Cloverfield Lane
 Valencia College, in Florida
 Valencia orange, a variety of the orange fruit
 Valencia (fish), a genus of fish
 Valencia (novel), a novel by Michelle Tea

See also 
 
 Valencia County News-Bulletin, a weekly newspaper in Belen, New Mexico, United States
Murder of Jesse Valencia (2004)
 Valancia, Pakistan
 Valença (disambiguation)
 Valence (disambiguation)
 Valensia (born 1971), Dutch composer, producer, and multi-instrumentalist
 Valentia (disambiguation)
Surnames of Colombian origin